In Greek and Roman mythology, Corone is a young woman who attracted the attention of Poseidon, the god of the sea, and was saved by Athena, the goddess of wisdom. She was a princess and the daughter of Coronaeus. Her brief tale is recounted in the narrative poem Metamorphoses by the Roman poet Ovid. Several other myths surround the crow about its connection to Athena.

Mythology

Poseidon 
According to Ovid, one day as Corone was walking by the seashore, the sea-god Poseidon saw her and attempted to seduce her. When his efforts failed he attempted to rape her instead, and Corone fled from his rapacious advances, crying out to men and gods, and while no man heard her, "the virgin goddess feels pity for a virgin"; Pallas Athena transformed her into a crow. An unspecified time later, she recounted her woes during a conversation with the raven, Lycius, who had grievances of his own. She also cited her resentment that her place as Athena's bird-servant was usurped and taken over by the owl, the metamorphosed Nyctimene, where the transformation was punitive. Ovid himself does not mention her by name and simply calls her cornix, or "the crow", in Latin. Instead her name proper is attested by an anonymous Greek paradoxographer.

Other narratives about Athena and the crow 
The relation between Athena and crows is not always amicable. In one myth, after Hephaestus tried to assault Athena and the infant Erichthonius was born from his semen that fell on the earth, Athena put the child in a box and gave it to the daughters of Cecrops, instructing them not to open the box before she returned. The maidens disobeyed her, and the crow flew to Athena bearing the news. Athena, angered over the ill news the crow brought her, cursed it to never be able to fly above the Acropolis.

In an Aesop fable, a crow invites a dog to banquet and sacrifices to Athena. The dog remarks that this is useless, as Athena dislikes her. The crow then answers that Athena might not like her, but she will sacrifice to her nonetheless in order to make amends with the goddess.

A fragment from the Hellenistic poet Callimachus implies a story, not surviving, where the crow warned the owl (Nyctimene?) against tale-bearing, lamenting that the wrath of Athena is a terrible thing.

The traveller Pausanias wrote that in Corone, a small town in Messenia in southwestern Peloponnese, a statue of Athena held in her outstretched hand a crow instead of the accustomed owl.

Later literature 
John Gower took up the tale for use in his Confessio Amantis, with particular emphasis on her delight in her escape:

With feathers of a coaly black, Out of his arms, like bolt from bow, She flew in likeness of a crow: And this, to her, was more delight - To keep her maiden treasure white Beneath a feather cloak of black - Than, pearly-skinned, to lose and lack What never can return again.

See also 

 Coronis
 Daphne
 Nyctaea
 Side

References

Bibliography 
 
 Gaius Julius Hyginus, Fabulae from The Myths of Hyginus translated and edited by Mary Grant. University of Kansas Publications in Humanistic Studies. Online version at the Topos Text Project.
 
 
 
  Online version at Perseus.tufts project.
  in 4 Volumes.
 Publius Ovidius Naso, Metamorphoses translated by Brookes More (1859-1942). Boston, Cornhill Publishing Co. 1922. Online version at the Perseus Digital Library.
 Publius Ovidius Naso, Metamorphoses. Hugo Magnus. Gotha (Germany). Friedr. Andr. Perthes. 1892. Latin text available at the Perseus Digital Library.
 
 

Characters in Greek mythology
Legendary crows
Metamorphoses into birds in Greek mythology
Women in Greek mythology
Mythological rape victims
Metamorphoses characters
Deeds of Athena
Deeds of Poseidon